Ignatius Park College is an independent Catholic secondary school for boys, located in Townsville, Queensland, Australia. The school is affiliated with Edmund Rice Education Australia network that operates under the direction of the Congregation of Christian Brothers. The school was established in 1969 at its current location in Cranbrook, though it was built as a successor school to Our Lady's Mount, the former Catholic boys' secondary that was located in Stanton Hill. The college has a student population of  1000 boys from Years 7 to 12.

House system

Like many other Australian high schools, Ignatius Park is built upon a system of seven houses, with the introduction of the Putney House (named after Michael Putney) in 2014. Each house has one class per year level, which is divided into two separate homerooms from Year 7 through to Year 10, and combines as one through Year 12. These houses are the Baillie House, Carew House, Nolan House, Putney House, Reid House, Rice House and Treacy House.

Facilities
Ignatius Park College has over 40 pianos and 20 guitars, with the combined music room worth around $100,000. It has around ten computer labs for student use. The Edmund Rice Hall is used for assemblies, special events and community use. Ignatius Park is one of a handful of schools in Queensland with a 50-metre Olympic swimming pool.

Rugby league
Ignatius Park's rugby league program is offered from U/13s through to the First XIII with around 300 students involved in teams.

Notable alumni 

 Tom Chester – professional rugby league player for the North Queensland Cowboys
 Jason Clarke – actor, known for his work in Terminator Genisys and Dawn of the Planet of the Apes
 Kyle Feldt – professional rugby league player for the North Queensland Cowboys
 Aidan Guerra – professional rugby league player for the Sydney Roosters
 Coen Hess – professional rugby league player for the North Queensland Cowboys and the Queensland Maroons
 Valentine Holmes – professional rugby league player for the Cronulla-Sutherland Sharks and the Queensland Maroons
 Corey Jensen – professional rugby league player for the Brisbane Broncos
 Patrick Kaufusi – professional rugby league player for the North Queensland Cowboys
 Joe Kelly – politician; Member for Greenslopes (Labor), Deputy Speaker of the Legislative Assembly
 Anthony Mitchell – professional rugby league player for the North Queensland Cowboys
 Michael Morgan – professional rugby league player for the North Queensland Cowboys and the Queensland Maroons
 Kayln Ponga – professional rugby league player for the Newcastle Knights and the Queensland Maroons
 Scott Prince – professional rugby league player for the Gold Coast Titans

See also 

 List of schools in Queensland
 Catholic education in Australia

References

Congregation of Christian Brothers secondary schools in Australia
Educational institutions established in 1969
Catholic secondary schools in Queensland
Schools in Townsville
1969 establishments in Australia